The Korean Intellectual Property Office (KIPO) is the patent office and intellectual property office of South Korea. In 2000, the name of the office was changed from "Korean Industrial Property Office" to "Korean Intellectual Property Office". It is located in Daejeon Metropolitan City.

Along with its counterparts from other countries, it forms part of the IP5 (intellectual property offices), which accounts for the majority of patents issued worldwide. 

On 23 June 2009, the KIPO signed a Memorandum of Understanding with the Eurasian Patent Organization.

See also 
 List of patent offices

References

External links 
 Korean Intellectual Property Office, in English
 Korea Intellectual Property Rights Information Service (KIPRIS), in English
 Patent search database in KIPRIS, in English
 K2E-PAT Interface in KIPRIS (wherein "K2E-PAT" stands for "Korean to English Automatic Machine Translation", see European Patent Office, "Lost in translation? Get the right type of Korean patent translation for your needs", Patent Information News, Issue 1, 2010, p. 4)
 Information about patent law in South Korea on the European Patent Office website

Intellectual property organizations
Patent offices
Government agencies of South Korea
International Searching and Preliminary Examining Authorities
Organizations based in Daejeon